Croniades is a Neotropical genus of firetips in the family Hesperiidae. The genus is monotypic. The single species is Croniades pieria, found in Bolivia, Brazil and Guyane.

References
Natural History Museum Lepidoptera genus database

External links
images representing Croniades at Consortium for the Barcode of Life

Hesperiidae
Hesperiidae of South America
Monotypic butterfly genera
Hesperiidae genera